Mount Braun is a mountain rising to about  in the northwest extremity of Sofia Mountains in northern Alexander Island, Antarctica. It was named by the Advisory Committee on Antarctic Names for Lieutenant Commander William K. Braun, U.S. Navy, C-121J (Super Constellation) aircraft commander, Squadron VXE-6, U.S. Navy Operation Deepfreeze, 1970 and 1971.

See also
 Mount Borodin
 Mount Paris
 Mount Liszt

References 

Mountains of Alexander Island